Shapwick Manor at Shapwick in the English county of Somerset is a medieval manor house which was largely remodelled in the 19th century by Henry Strangways on his return from South Australia in 1871. It is a Grade II* listed building.

It is not to be confused with Shapwick House, formerly an hotel, and more recently a rental property, which lies to the north of the village.

History
The manor of Shapwick originally belonged to Glastonbury Abbey, forming part of its Pouholt (Polden) estate in 729.  The building that is known as Shapwick House, not the Manor, was built for the Almoner of Glastonbury Abbey in the Middle Ages. A survey in 1327 includes a  garden, moat and fishponds.

Between 1956 and 1980, Shapwick Manor was an outlying boarding house for boys at Millfield School, and was later home to Shapwick School, which closed in March 2020.

Architecture

Shapwick Manor is a two-storey stone building that has an asymmetrical frontage, formerly with a glazed veranda supported on iron columns  to one side of the building. The stable block, which was built in the 17th century, is also Grade II* listed. The dovecote is medieval but was restored in the 18th and 19th centuries; it was re-roofed in the 20th century. The stone screen and flanking walls were built around 1658.

References

Further reading
 

Grade II* listed buildings in Sedgemoor
Manor houses in England
Somerset
History of South Australia